Aretha is the twenty-sixth studio album by American singer Aretha Franklin. It was released on September 30, 1980, by Arista Records. This is Franklin's second eponymous album, and her first for Arista Records after a 12-year tenure with Atlantic Records.

Franklin's first Arista single release, "United Together", reached number 3 on the Soul chart and crossed over to number 56 on Billboards Hot 100. The album itself peaked at number 47 and spent 30 weeks on the Billboard album chart.

The album's opening track, "Come to Me", appeared again on Franklin's 1989 album, Through the Storm.

Track listing

Personnel
Aretha Franklin – vocals, keyboards, piano, backing vocals
David Foster – piano, Fender Rhodes, synthesizer
David Paich – piano, Hammond organ
Todd Cochran – synthesizer, programming
Steve Porcaro, Bob Christianson – additional synthesizer
Ed Greene, Yogi Horton, Jeff Porcaro, Bernard Purdie – drums
Francisco Centeno, Scott Edwards, Louis Johnson, James Jamerson, Mike Porcaro – bass guitar
Michael McGlory, Cornell Dupree, Paul Jackson Jr., Steve Lukather, David T. Walker, David Williams – guitar
George Devens – percussion
Richard Tee, Michael Lang – keyboards
Tony Coleman – keyboards, bass guitar, backing vocals
Michael Brecker, Seldon Powell, David "Fathead" Newman – tenor saxophone
Lew Del Gatto – baritone saxophone
Dave Tofani, David Sanborn – alto saxophone
Randy Brecker, Lew Soloff – trumpet
Barry Rogers – trombone
Jerry Hey – horns
John Clark, Peter Gordon – French horn
Jonathan Abramowitz, Jack Barber, A. Brown, Peter Dimitriades, Harold Kohon, Harry Lookofsky, Joseph Malin, Alan Shulman, Mitsue Takayama, Gerald Tarack, M. Wright, Frederick Zlotkin, F. Zoltin – strings
Strings and Horns arranged by Arif Mardin and Benjamin Wright
Kitty Beethoven, Ortheia Barnes, Estelle Brown, Tony Coleman, Brenda Corbett, Preston Glass, Larry Graham, Jennifer Hall, Chuck Jackson, Liz Jackson, Edie Lehmann, Myrna Matthews, Marti McCall, Claytoven Richardson, Esther Ridgeway, Gloria Ridgeway, Sylvia Shemwell, Myrna Smith, Hamish Stuart, The Sweet Inspirations, Jeanie Tracy – backing vocals

Production
Produced by Chuck Jackson (tracks 3, 4, 5, 7 and 9) and Arif Mardin (tracks 1, 2, 6 and 8).
Co-producer on track 9: Aretha Franklin
Engineers: Lee DeCarlo and Frank Kejmar  (tracks 3, 4, 5, 7 and 9); Jeremy Smith (tracks 1, 2, 6 and 8).
Additional engineer: Lewis Hahn
Assistant engineers: Michael O'Reilly, Stewart Whitmore
Mixing on tracks 3, 4, 5, 7 and 9: Reginald Dozier 
Re-mixing: Lewis Hahn and Gene Paul (tracks 1–7 and 9); Arif Mardin and Michael O'Reilly (track 8).
Re-mix assistant on track 8: Joe Mardin 
Recorded at MCA Whitney Recording Studios (Glendale), Record Plant (Los Angeles), Sound Labs Studios (Hollywood) and Atlantic Studios (New York City).
Edited at Cherokee Studios (Los Angeles).
Mixed at MCA Whitney Recording Studios and Cherokee Studios.
Mastering: Ken Perry and Bill Inglot at Sterling Sound (New York).
Art direction and design: Ria Lewerke-Shapiro
Photography: George Hurrell

Charts

Weekly charts

Year-end charts

References

1980 albums
Aretha Franklin albums
Albums produced by Arif Mardin
Albums produced by Narada Michael Walden
Arista Records albums